The Adriatic Ionian Euroregion is a Euroregion comprising countries and their subdivisions bordering the Adriatic and Ionian Sea. The president of the organization is Nikola Dobroslavić, President of the Region of Dubrovnik. The Euroregion is formally established as a non-profit organization according to the law of Croatia. 

The Adriatic Ionian Euroregion was founded on June 30, 2006 in Pula, Region of Istria, Croatia.

It represents a model of co-operation that includes trans-national and inter-regional co-operation between regions of the Adriatic and Ionian coastline.

The Adriatic Ionian Euroregion is the institutional framework for jointly defining and solving important issues in the Adriatic area. It consists of 28 members - Regional and local governments from Italy, Slovenia, Croatia, Bosnia and Herzegovina, Montenegro and Albania.

The aims of the AIE are the fallowing:
 Forming an area of peace, stability and co-operation
 Protection of the cultural heritage
 Protection of the environment
 Sustainable economic development in particular of tourism, fishery and agriculture
 Solution of transport and other infrastructure issues

Members

Italy
 Region of Apulia
 Region of Molise
 Region of Abruzzo
 Region of the Marche
 Region of Emilia-Romagna
 Region of Veneto
 Autonomous Region of Friuli-Venezia Giulia
Slovenia
 Municipality of Koper
 Municipality of Izola
 Municipality of Piran
Croatia
 Istria County
 Primorje-Gorski Kotar County
 Lika-Senj County
 Zadar County
 Šibenik-Knin County
 Split-Dalmatia County
 Dubrovnik-Neretva County
Bosnia and Herzegovina
 Canton 10
 Herzegovina-Neretva Canton
 Una-Sana Canton
 Montenegro 
 Albania
Greece

External links
 Adriatic Ionian Euroregion official site

Geography of Croatia
Geography of Italy
Adriatic Sea
Euroregions
2006 establishments in Europe
Geography of Bosnia and Herzegovina
Geography of Albania
Geography of Montenegro
Geography of Slovenia